The Plaza Aníbal Pinto is a plaza built on reclaimed land in Valparaíso, Chile. Formerly Plaza del Orden, Plaza Aníbal Pinto is named after Aníbal Pinto. It features a fountain called "Fuente de Neptuno" (Fountain of Neptune), which was erected in 1892.

References 

Squares in Chile
Buildings and structures in Valparaíso